Cerynea ignealis is a species of moth in the family Erebidae first described by George Hampson in 1910. It is found in Kenya, Madagascar, South Africa and in São Tomé and Príncipe.

References 

Boletobiinae
Moths of Madagascar
Moths of Africa
Moths described in 1910